Alfie James Chang (born 4 September 2002) is an English professional footballer who plays as a midfielder for  club Birmingham City.

Early life and career
Chang attended Droitwich Spa High School. He took up a two-year scholarship with Birmingham City's Academy in July 2019. According to the then academy manager Kristjaan Speakman, Chang "is most effective as a deep midfield player. In this position he is able to dictate the tempo of the game and through calm and composed possession is able to demonstrate an excellent range of passing. In higher areas of the pitch he has the creativity and cleverness to construct play able to create opening for forward players."

Playing in central midfield, he captained Birmingham's under-18s in their 2020–21 FA Youth Cup campaign, and played for Birmingham's U23 team as they beat Sheffield United U23 in the national final of that season's Professional Development League. Chang was one of five under-18s offered their first professional contract in 2021, and one of four who accepted.

Chang was given a squad number and named on the bench for Birmingham's EFL Cup first-round match at home to Colchester United of League One. He remained unused, but in the second round of the same competition, on 24 August, he replaced Dion Sanderson after 73 minutes to make his senior debut as Birmingham lost 2–0 at home to Fulham. His next appearance was also his first senior start, in the first round of the 2022–23 EFL Cup away to Norwich City, which Birmingham lost on penalties. "A composed midfield performance" in that game was followed four days later by his Football League debut. With Ryan Woods on the verge of leaving the club, Chang started alongside Jordan James in central midfield in Birmingham's visit to Cardiff City in the Championship; he played 75 minutes of the 1–0 defeat.

Career statistics

References

2002 births
Living people
Sportspeople from Worcestershire
English footballers
Association football midfielders
Birmingham City F.C. players
English Football League players